Thomas A. Dempster (born February 9, 1949) is an American politician. He served in the South Dakota Senate from 2003 to 2011.

References

1949 births
Living people
Politicians from Sioux Falls, South Dakota
Businesspeople from South Dakota
South Dakota Republicans
South Dakota Independents
South Dakota state senators